Jarava plumosa (syn. Stipa papposa) is a species of grass in the family Poaceae, native to the Southern Cone of South America. It has been introduced to other places with a Mediterranean climate; California, Spain, Israel, the Cape Provinces of South Africa, and South Australia. As its synonym Stipa papposa it has gained the Royal Horticultural Society's Award of Garden Merit as an ornamental in spite of its invasive potential.

References

Pooideae
Flora of South Brazil
Flora of central Chile
Flora of southern Chile
Flora of Northeast Argentina
Flora of Northwest Argentina
Flora of South Argentina
Flora of Uruguay
Plants described in 1997